The Garden Egg chair was designed by Peter Ghyczy in 1968. It was manufactured by Reuter Products. The chair was designed for both indoor and outdoor use, although as a design icon and collectable it is rarely used outdoors. The chair lid lifts and closes, and when closed is theoretically waterproof. The Egg chair was re-introduced in 2001 by Ghyczy Novo. The Garden Egg Chair is known by several names; “seftenberger ei, pod chair, l’œuf en garden(egg)chair.” Elastogran/Reuter produced the plastic polyurethane. Ghyczy's job was to start a design centre in order to show industrial customers polyurethane's potential. The Garden Egg Chair is one of the first chairs made with polyurethane. For a long time, the chair was produced by the East German company VEB-Synthese-Werk, but since 1998, it has been produced in the Netherlands.

Designer

Peter Ghyczy (born 1940 in Budapest) left his native Hungary in 1956 because of the revolution and moved to West Germany. Here he finished his high school and studied at the Düsseldorf Art Academy and University of Aachen. After graduating he started as head of the design department at Elastogran/Reuter where he developed the Garden Egg Chair in 1968. What he saw as traditional way of working at Elastogran/Reuter led him to leave the company in 1972. He moved to the Netherlands and started his own company, simply called Ghyczy.

Modern Interpretations
Modern garden egg chairs use the new rattan-effect synthetic material to create a woven basket like chair (often hanging from a frame) that simulates the original egg chair shape. They are often called a "hanging egg chair" or "rattan egg chair".

See also
List of chairs

References

External links
 Official Ghyczy website
 Official Ghyczy Facebook page
 Official Garden Egg chair website
 Garden Egg chair at the Victoria and Albert Museum

Chairs
Individual models of furniture